The Men's 4 × 100-metre medley relay competition of the 2022 FINA World Swimming Championships (25 m) was held on 18 December 2022.

Records
Prior to the competition, the existing world and championship records were as follows.

The following new records were set during this competition:

Results

Heats
The heats were started at 12:29.

Final
The final was held at 21:19.

References

Men 4 x 100-metre medley relay